Zhen Dong Zhang , native form as Zhang Zhen Dong(张臻东 born 16 May 1992) is a Chinese racing driver currently competing in the TCR International Series and China Touring Car Championship. Having previously competed in the Porsche Carrera Cup Asia, Formula Masters China and Asian Formula Renault Challenge amongst others.

Racing career
Zhang began his career in 2007 in the Asian Formula Renault Challenge, he continued in the championship until 2008. In 2008 he also raced in the Formula Asia 2.0, he finished the season tenth in the championship standings that year. For 2010 he switched to the China Touring Car Championship, driving for the Haima team, he continued with the team for 2011, taking a single victory on his way to finishing sixth in the standings that year. For 2012 he switched to the Volkswagen team, finishing his first season the team eleventh in standings. Continuing with the team for many seasons, he won the championship in 2015 and 2016, taking several victories and podiums. In 2013 he raced in the Formula Masters China series. For 2014 he raced in the Porsche Carrera Cup Asia, he continued in the series for two further seasons, along with his CTCC programme.

In September 2017 it was announced that he would race in the TCR International Series, driving an Audi RS 3 LMS TCR for ZZZ Team.

Racing record

Complete TCR International Series results
(key) (Races in bold indicate pole position) (Races in italics indicate fastest lap)

References

External links
 

1992 births
Living people
TCR International Series drivers
Chinese racing drivers
FIA Motorsport Games drivers
Asian Formula Renault Challenge drivers
Formula Masters China drivers
TCR Asia Series drivers
Asia Racing Team drivers